The Frostburg State Bobcats are the athletic teams that represent Frostburg State University, located in Frostburg, Maryland, in NCAA Division II intercollegiate sports. The Bobcats compete as members of the Mountain East Conference for all sports except men's lacrosse, which is a single-sport member of the East Coast Conference.

Facilities
The Bobcat Natatorium is located in the Cordts PE Center and houses the men's and women's swimming and diving teams.

Bob Wells Field is home to the FSU baseball team, and is long through center field and long down the sidelines. In addition, it has 250-person seating next to the field.

The FSU softball team plays in the Bobcat Field, which opened in 2001. The seating holds around 250.

The Cordts Tennis Complex is home to FSU's men's and women's tennis teams and is located behind the Cordts PE Center. It contains six courts.

The Bobcat Stadium was opened in 1974 and has an eight-lane track, with 4,000 seats. It is home to the FSU football, men's and women's soccer, field hockey, men's and women's lacrosse, and men's and women's track and field teams.

Varsity teams

List of teams

Men's sports (9)
 Baseball
 Basketball
 Cross Country
 Football
 Lacrosse
 Soccer
 Swimming
 Tennis
 Track and field

Women's sports (11)
 Acrobats and tumbling
 Basketball
 Cross country
 Field hockey
 Lacrosse
 Soccer
 Softball
 Swimming
 Tennis
 Track and field
 Volleyball

References

External links